William Edwin Minshall Jr. (October 24, 1911 – October 15, 1990) was an American lawyer and politician who served ten terms as a Republican member of the U.S. House of Representatives from Ohio from 1955 to 1974.

Early life and career 
William E. Minshall Jr. was born in East Cleveland, Ohio to William E. Minshall and Mabel Rice. William came from a family of lawyers with his father being a trial lawyer and his grandfather Thaddeus A. Minshall, who prior to becoming an Ohio Supreme Court judge had a private practice in law. William attended the public schools of East Cleveland, the University School in Shaker Heights, Ohio, and the University of Virginia at Charlottesville, Virginia, where he was a member of the Chi Phi Fraternity.

He graduated from the Cleveland Law School in 1940, was admitted to the bar the same year and commenced the practice of law in Cleveland, Ohio.

He was a member of the Ohio House of Representatives in 1939 and 1940.

World War II 
He enlisted in December 1940 as a private in the United States Army and served in the European Theater, G-2 section, Headquarters III Corps, and was discharged as a lieutenant colonel in March 1946.  He was awarded a Bronze Star.

He was special assistant attorney general of Ohio from 1948 to 1952 and general counsel for the Maritime Administration of Washington, D.C., in 1953 and 1954.

Congress 
Minshall was elected as a Republican to the Eighty-fourth Congress and to the nine succeeding Congresses and served until his resignation December 31, 1974. Minshall voted in favor of the Civil Rights Acts of 1957, 1964, and 1968, and the Voting Rights Act of 1965, while voting present on the Civil Rights Act of 1960.  He was not a candidate for reelection in 1974 to the Ninety-fourth Congress.

Death
He was a resident of Delray Beach, Florida, until his death on October 15, 1990.

References

 Retrieved on 2008-01-29
The Political Graveyard

1911 births
1990 deaths
Burials at Arlington National Cemetery
Republican Party members of the Ohio House of Representatives
Politicians from Cleveland
United States Army personnel of World War II
United States Army officers
Ohio lawyers
University of Virginia alumni
Cleveland–Marshall College of Law alumni
People from Delray Beach, Florida
20th-century American politicians
20th-century American lawyers
Republican Party members of the United States House of Representatives from Ohio